William Thomas Smyth (c. 1925 – 14 January 2005) was a Northern Irish footballer who played as a goalkeeper.

Career
Born in Belfast, Smyth played for Balmoral United, Distillery and Ards. He also earned four caps for the Northern Ireland national team.

References

1920s births
2005 deaths
Association footballers from Northern Ireland
Northern Ireland international footballers
Lisburn Distillery F.C. players
Ards F.C. players
NIFL Premiership players
Association football goalkeepers